Anti-literacy laws in many slave states before and during the American Civil War affected slaves, freedmen, and in some cases all people of color. Some laws arose from concerns that literate slaves could forge the documents required to escape to a free state. According to William M. Banks, "Many slaves who learned to write did indeed achieve freedom by this method. The wanted posters for runaways often mentioned whether the escapee could write." Anti-literacy laws also arose from fears of slave insurrection, particularly around the time of abolitionist David Walker's 1829 publication of Appeal to the Colored Citizens of the World, which openly advocated rebellion, and Nat Turner's slave rebellion of 1831.

The United States is the only country known to have had anti-literacy laws.

State anti-literacy laws

Between 1740 and 1834 Alabama, Georgia, Louisiana, Mississippi, North and South Carolina, and Virginia all passed anti-literacy laws. South Carolina passed the first law which prohibited teaching slaves to read and write, punishable by a fine of 100 pounds and six months in prison, via an amendment to its 1739 Negro Act.

Significant anti-black laws include: 
 1829, Georgia: Prohibited teaching blacks to read, punished by fine and imprisonment
 1830, Louisiana, North Carolina:  passes law punishing anyone teaching blacks to read with fines, imprisonment or floggings 
 1832, Alabama and Virginia: Prohibited whites from teaching blacks to read or write, punished by fines and floggings
 1833, Georgia: Prohibited blacks from working in reading or writing jobs (via an employment law), and prohibited teaching blacks, punished by fines and whippings (via an anti-literacy law)
 1847, Missouri: Prohibited assembling or teaching slaves to read or write

Mississippi state law required a white person to serve up to a year in prison as "penalty for teaching a slave to read."

A 19th-century Virginia law specified: "[E]very assemblage of negroes for the purpose of instruction in reading or writing, or in the night time for any purpose, shall be an unlawful assembly. Any justice may issue his warrant to any office or other person, requiring him to enter any place where such assemblage may be, and seize any negro therein; and he, or any other justice, may order such negro to be punished with stripes."

In North Carolina, black people who disobeyed the law were sentenced to whipping while whites received a fine and/or jail time.

AME Bishop William Henry Heard remembered from his enslaved childhood in Georgia that any slave caught writing "suffered the penalty of having his forefinger cut from his right hand." Other formerly enslaved people had similar memories of disfigurement and severe punishments for reading and writing.

Restrictions on the education of black students were not limited to the South. While teaching blacks in the North was not illegal, many Northern states, counties, and cities barred black students from public schools. What few schools there were for black students were projects funded by donations from Quakers and other philanthropists. The attempt in 1831 to open a college for black students in New Haven, Connecticut was met with such overwhelming local resistance that the project was almost immediately abandoned (see Simeon Jocelyn). Private schools in New Hampshire and Connecticut that attempted to educate black and white students together were destroyed by mobs (see Noyes Academy and Canterbury Female Boarding School).

Resistance

Educators and slaves in the South found ways to both circumvent and challenge the law. John Berry Meachum, for example, moved his school out of St. Louis, Missouri when that state passed an anti-literacy law in 1847, and re-established it as the Floating Freedom School on a steamship on the Mississippi River, which was beyond the reach of Missouri state law. After she was arrested, tried, and served a month in prison for educating free black children in Norfolk, Virginia, Margaret Crittendon Douglas wrote a book on her experiences, which helped draw national attention to the anti-literacy laws. Frederick Douglass taught himself to read while he was enslaved.

Despite the risks, literacy was seen by the enslaved as a means of advancement and liberation, and they secretly learned from and taught one another. One historian noted that 20% of the runaway slaves in antebellum Kentucky were able to read, and 10% were able to write. Enterprising child slaves would trade items like marbles and oranges to white children in exchange for reading lessons, and adults sometimes learned from other adults, black and white.  One enslaved man, Lucius Holsey, acquired a library of five books by selling rags: two spelling books, a dictionary, John Milton's Paradise Lost, and the Bible. With these five books, he painstakingly taught himself to read by memorizing single words.

John Hope Franklin says that despite the laws, schools for enslaved Black students existed throughout the South, including in Georgia, the Carolinas, Kentucky, Louisiana, Florida, Louisiana, Tennessee, and Virginia. In 1838, Virginia's free black population petitioned the state, as a group, to send their children to school outside of Virginia to bypass its anti-literacy law. They were refused.

In some cases, slaveholders ignored the laws. They looked the other way when their children played school and taught their slave playmates how to read and write. Some slaveholders saw the economic benefit in having literate slaves who could undertake business transactions and keep accounts. Others believed that slaves should be sufficiently literate to read the Bible.

In Norfolk, Virginia, the anti-literacy law was not abolished until after the Civil War, in 1867, as a result of black residents petitioning the federal government to end it.

References

Literacy
African-American society
Slavery in the United States
Discrimination in the United States
Pre-emancipation African-American history
Anti-black racism in the United States
Culture of the Southern United States
United States education law